Sōtarō, Sotaro or Soutarou (written: , , , ,) or ) is a masculine Japanese given name. Notable people with the name include:

, American actor and model
, Japanese judoka
, Japanese footballer
, Japanese psycholinguist
, Japanese admiral
, Japanese footballer
, Japanese painter
, Japanese footballer

See also
Sōtarō Station, a railway station in Saiki, Oita Prefecture, Japan

Japanese masculine given names